Kazuhiko ( or ) is a masculine Japanese given name. Notable people with the name include:

 , politician
 , a video game producer
 Kazuhiko Chiba, Japanese footballer
 Kazuhiko Hasegawa, film director
 Kazuhiko Hosokawa, professional golfer
 Kazuhiko Ikematsu, freestyle wrestler
 Kazuhiko Inoue, a voice actor
 Kazuhiko Iwaike, known as K.A.Z, Japanese musician, guitarist and songwriter
 Kazuhiko Katō (born 1937), manga creator who uses the pen-name of Monkey Punch
 Kazuhiko Katō (1947–2009), nicknamed "Tonovan", record producer, songwriter, singer, member of Sadistic Mika Band
 Kazuhiko Kishino, actor and voice-actor
, Japanese rower
 Kazuhiko Matsumoto, adult video director
 Kazuhiko Nishi 1980s Vice President of Microsoft's Far East operations
 Kazuhiko Nishijima (1926 – 2009) particle physicist
, Japanese politician
 Kazuhiko Shimamoto, Manga artist
 Kazuhiko Shingyoji, footballer, Blaublitz Akita (previously called TDK S.C.)
 Kazuhiko Sugawara, speed skater
 Kazuhiko Tabuchi, Olympic fencer
 Kazuhiko Tokuno, Judo champion
 Kazuhiko Toyama composer of music for manga
 , Japanese baseball player
 Kazuhiko Wakasugi, fencer
 Kazuhiko Yamaguchi, film director

Fictional characters 
 Kazuhiko Yamamoto, a character in the novel Battle Royale - see List of Battle Royale characters
 Kazuhiko Akiyama, a character in Sasuke (TV series)

See also 
 26170 Kazuhiko, a main belt asteroid

Japanese masculine given names